The Nazis murdered their victims at a wide variety of sites, including vehicles, houses, hospitals, fields, concentration camps and purpose-built extermination camps. The six major extermination camps and eight major euthanasia extermination centers are listed here.

Extermination camps
During the Final Solution of the Holocaust, Nazi Germany created six extermination camps to carry out the systematic genocide of the Jews in German-occupied Europe. All the camps were located in the General Government area of German-occupied Poland, with the exception of Chelmno, which was located in the Reichsgau Wartheland of German-occupied Poland. 
 Chelmno (December1941July1944).
 Belzec (March1942June1943).
 Sobibor (May1942November1943).
 Treblinka (July1942September1943).
 Majdanek (October1942July1944). Located just outside the city of Lublin.
 Auschwitz-Birkenau (February1942November1944).

Euthanasia extermination centers
In the period leading to the Final Solution, Nazi Germany created eight major euthanasia extermination centers to carry out the systematic genocide of the disabled. Scholars have established a fundamental connection between the motivation, the practical experience and psychological preparation, and the technology used in the Nazi euthanasia centers as part of Aktion T4 and Action 14f13 and the extermination camps used in the Holocaust. The dates of operation are for the period the facility operated as a euthanasia killing center.

Germany 
 Bernburg. Located in Saxony near Magdeburg.
 Brandenburg. Located near Berlin.
 Grafeneck. Located in Gomadingen near Stuttgart.
 Hadamar. Located in Hessen near Frankfurt.
 Sonnenstein. Located in Saxony near Dresden.
Austria 
 Am Spiegelgrund. Located in Vienna.
 Gugging. Located just outside Vienna.
 Hartheim. Located near Linz.

Further reading

See also

Notes

References

External links
 Auschwitz-Birkenau Memorial and Museum
 Holocaust Encyclopedia
 Memory of Treblinka Memorial
 Museum and Memorial at Bełżec
 Museum and Memorial at Sobibor
 State Museum at Majdanek
 United States Holocaust Memorial Museum
 Yad Vashem - The World Holocaust Remembrance Center

Nazi extermination camps
The Holocaust-related lists
Nazi SS